George Shaw may refer to:

 George Shaw (biologist) (1751–1813), English botanist and zoologist
 George B. Shaw (1854–1894), U.S. Representative from Wisconsin
 George Bernard Shaw (1856–1950), Irish playwright
 George C. Shaw (1866–1960), Philippine–American War Medal of Honor recipient
 George Ferdinand Shaw (1821–1899), Irish academic and journalist
 George Shaw (academic dress scholar) (1928–2006), biologist and British expert on academic dress
 George Shaw (artist) (born 1966), English contemporary artist
 George Shaw (Queensland politician) (1913–1966), member of the Australian House of Representatives
 George Shaw (civil servant), Lieutenant Governor of the British Crown Colony of Burma, 1913
 George Shaw (composer), musician and film composer
 George Shaw (Tasmanian politician) (born 1932), member of the Tasmanian Legislative Council
 George Shaw (architect) (1810–1876), English architect

Sportspeople
 George Shaw (American football) (1933–1998), American football quarterback
 George Shaw (cricketer, born 1839) (1839–1905), English cricketer
 George Shaw (cricketer, born 1931) (1931–1984), Welsh cricketer
 George Shaw (footballer, born 1877) (1877–1954), Australian rules footballer in the 1890s
 George Shaw (footballer, born 1886) (1886–1971), Australian rules footballer in the 1910s
 George Shaw (footballer, born 1899) (1899–1973), English football player
 George Shaw (footballer, born 1969), Scottish football player & manager of Forfar
 George Shaw (triple jumper) (1931–1988), American Olympic athlete
 Slotch Shaw (George Shaw, 1865–1928), English footballer